The Bank of Long Prairie is a former bank building in Long Prairie, Minnesota, United States.  It was built in 1903 as the new headquarters of Todd County's first and largest bank, established in 1881.  The building was listed on the National Register of Historic Places in 1985 for having local significance in the themes of architecture and commerce.  It was nominated for its Romanesque/Classical Revival design by Omeyer & Thori and for playing a key financial role in the development of Long Prairie and Todd County.

See also
 National Register of Historic Places listings in Todd County, Minnesota

References

External links

1903 establishments in Minnesota
Bank buildings on the National Register of Historic Places in Minnesota
Buildings and structures in Todd County, Minnesota
Commercial buildings completed in 1903
National Register of Historic Places in Todd County, Minnesota
Neoclassical architecture in Minnesota
Romanesque Revival architecture in Minnesota
Omeyer & Thori buildings